Route 55 Business or Highway 55 Business may refer to:

 I-55 Business, business routes for Interstate 55
 Georgia State Route 55 Business (former)
 M-55 Business, former business route for M-55

See also
List of highways numbered 55
List of highways numbered 55A